The Third Katsura Cabinet is the 15th Cabinet of Japan led by Katsura Tarō from December 21, 1912, to February 20, 1913.

Cabinet

References 

Cabinet of Japan
1912 establishments in Japan
Cabinets established in 1912
Cabinets disestablished in 1913